João Pedro Maciel Gomes, known as João Pedro (born 25 April 1996) is a Brazilian professional association football player who plays for FC Pinzgau Saalfelden.

Club career
He made his Austrian Football First League debut for FC Liefering on 27 February 2017 in a game against SC Austria Lustenau and scored on his debut.

On 2 July 2018, he signed for Östers IF in Superettan, Sweden's second tier, on a one year-contract (with an option for a further).

Honours 
FC Liefering
Runner-up
 Austrian Football First League: 2014–15

Osasco Audax
Runner-up
 Copa Paulista: 2013

References

External links 
 
 

1996 births
Living people
Brazilian footballers
Brazilian expatriate footballers
Association football midfielders
Clube Atlético Mineiro players
Grêmio Osasco Audax Esporte Clube players
FC Liefering players
Oeste Futebol Clube players
SC Austria Lustenau players
Coimbra Esporte Clube players
Östers IF players
Maringá Futebol Clube players
2. Liga (Austria) players
Superettan players
Brazilian expatriate sportspeople in Austria
Brazilian expatriate sportspeople in Sweden
Expatriate footballers in Austria
Expatriate footballers in Sweden